This list of exoplanets discovered in 2019 is a list of confirmed exoplanets that were first observed during 2019.

For exoplanets detected only by radial velocity, the listed value for mass is a lower limit. See Minimum mass for more information.

Specific exoplanet lists

References

2019

exoplanets